Iola or IOLA may refer to:
 Iola, the nom de plume of African-American writer Ida B. Wells
 Iola (steamboat 1885), a steamboat active on Puget Sound from 1885 to 1915
 Interest on Lawyer Trust Accounts, a method of raising money for charitable purposes in the United States
 Myrmarachne, a genus of jumping spiders

Places
In the United States
Iola, Colorado, a ghost town
Iola, Illinois, a village in Clay County, Illinois
Iola, Kansas, a city in Allen County, Kansas
Iola, Pennsylvania, a census-designated place in Columbia County, Pennsylvania
Iola, Texas, a city in Grimes County, Texas
Iola, Wisconsin, a village in Waupaca County, Wisconsin
Iola (town), Wisconsin, a town in Waupaca County, Wisconsin

Given name
 Iola Fuller (1906–1993), American writer
 Iola Gregory (1946–2017), Welsh actress
 Iola Abraham Ikkidluak (1936–2003), Inuit artist
 Iola Johnson (born 1950), American news anchor

Fictional characters 
 Iola Boylan, character on the television series Mama's Family played by Beverly Archer
 Iola Leroy, novel by African-American author Frances Harper
 Iola Morton, girlfriend of Joe Hardy in the Hardy Boys novels